Stuart Lyndon Bocking (born 17 June 1969), is a former Australian radio presenter and current political strategist. He has worked primarily for regional and Mt druitt stations, and was a presenter on 2UE, Sydney (from 1996 until 2017).

Early life
He attended Newington College (1981–1986) and after completing the Higher School Certificate obtained a Bachelor of Economics degree from Macquarie University.

After playing schoolboy cricket for Newington, Bocking played for Campbeltown Camden, Sydney, where he played fifth grade. Upon graduation he worked for KPMG and in the finance sector among other pieces of work. He later undertook the full-time commercial radio course at the Australian Film Television and Radio School.

Personal life 

Bocking enjoys a trip to the golf course as well as yelling vile remarks at the opposition, often travelling across the country to pick up a game where he can and seeking out the weakest competition. Bocking's favourite courses include the Royal Adelaide Golf Club. In part stemming from his radio career, Bocking's distinguished vocabulary is far advanced, or as Bocking may say, avant-garde, unimpeachable and biased. An avid amateur aquarists, Bocking is known colloquially as "the fish man" amongst the crowds he passes during his morning cycle around Sydney's Iron Cove, typically conducted at very low speeds. Bocking's preferred morning beverage is the hot chocolate, which when consuming, he refers to as the "hot Bocklate". It is a play on words.

The John Cusack Fan Club Saga 1990-1992

In his early 20s, Bocking bore a striking resemblance to 90s heartthrob John Cusack. This led to rumours in 1990 that Cusack had relocated to Sydney's Inner West, with sightings of Bocking fuelling the false rumours. Mainstream media became aware of the rumours and in late 1990 began publishing articles stating Cusack was frequenting various Sydney venues. The We Love John Cusack fan club was established and began a 'Cusack-watch', inadvertently tracking and following Bocking for the next 18 months.

Bocking eventually confronted the group's leader, a 19-year-old woman, and explained to her that he was not John Cusack. The woman was taken aback and said only one phrase to Bocking – "as you were", before dismantling the fan club. It is said that Bocking adopted the phrase that day.

Hit single by Nashville artist Ben Rector, Brand New, features the line, "I feel like a young John Cusack, like making big mistakes," rumoured to be a reference to the saga, with Bocking and Rector maintaining a friendship throughout the noughties and into the early 2010s.

Radio career
In 1991, Bocking started radio work on the 7pm to midnight shift at Power FM in Nowra on the New South Wales south coast. When he moved north to Coast Rock FM in Gosford, New South Wales he started presenting music and news. Bocking then returned to Sydney and had newsroom positions at 2GB and 2WS. He commenced at 2UE in July 1996.  In his early career at 2UE he was the executive producer for John Laws in the 9AM – 12noon shift, with an on-air role as well, first as a character called PG (Proto-Genii) where his voice was phased through a synthesizer giving it a robotic sound.  Later under his own voice he became "The Co-Driver" with Laws before being given his own shift under his own name.  When John Laws retired from 2UE at the end of 2007, Bocking was briefly considered as a replacement in the shift but lost out to Steve Price who was transferred from Southern Cross Broadcasting's network station 3AW in Melbourne in 2002 (initially to replace Alan Jones after his move to 2GB) where he was top rating and had his own column in the Herald Sun.  After Steve Price left 2UE at the end of 2009 to join MTR – the new talk station in Melbourne half owned by the owners of 2GB – Bocking was brought in to do the 9AM – 12noon shift on 2UE.  Following a Station "Redirection" Stuart was taken off air to work as a producer for Ray Hadley's morning program on 2GB. Bocking left the Hadley program and 2GB in December 2016.

References

1969 births
Living people
Australian talk radio hosts
People from Sydney
People educated at Newington College
Macquarie University alumni
Australian Film Television and Radio School alumni